The Last Time I Saw Macao is a 2012 Portuguese film directed by João Pedro Rodrigues and João Rui Guerra da Mata. It competed for the Golden Leopard at the 2012 Locarno International Film Festival. It was shot in Macau.

Synopsis 
Thirty years after leaving Macao for Lisbon, Guerra da Mata returns to his hometown, at the request of Candy, a transvestite whose questionable associations make him fear for his life. As soon as he arrives at the hotel, Guerra da Mata receives a call from a frightened Candy, asking him to urgently join his friend A-Kan in front of a sex shop downtown. Arriving too late at the meeting, Guerra da Mata loses track of Candy.

References

External links

The Last Time I Saw Macao at Cineuropa

2012 films
Portuguese drama films
Films shot in Macau
Films directed by João Pedro Rodrigues
Sophia Award winners